Gihan Adrian Camil Fernando (born 30 August 1967), popularly as Gihan Fernando, is an actor in Sri Lankan cinema, stage drama and television as well as a playwright and singer. Highly versatile actor from drama to comedy, Fernando is one of the most popular actors in Sri Lankan theater and television.

Personal life
He was born on 30 August 1967 in Galudipita village in Ragama as the eldest of the family. He has one younger brother and two younger sisters. He is an old boy of De Mazenod College, Kandana. In school, he was a bright student and clever in soccer. Before entering drama, he worked as a university non-academic staff member.

Acting career
After finishing school, he studied about theater under numerous foreign theater directors through the British Council while working in a company. In 1998, along with another fellow actor late Asela Jayakody, he went to a workshop conducted by Jayalal Rohana. Then, both were lucky to act in Rohana's stage drama, Bhoothawesha. He got the opportunity to act in stage roles under late Somalatha Subasinghe, K. B. Herath, Rajitha Dissanayake, Ravindra Ariyaratne and Dharmapriya Dias. He won the Best Actor Award at the Youth Drama Festival in 1990 for his role in Royston Jude's play Rangahala. Then he acted in Macbeth which was produced by a theater group formed in Wattala under the banner Wattala Kattiya.

His maiden television acting came through Hiru Kumari directed by Nalan Mendis in 1998. Along with Kumara Thirimadura, Fernando engaged in a stage play Giha Saha Kuma.

In 2016, he organized a theatre festival titled Ma Dakina Mama to celebrate the silver jubilee of his theater career in theater. It was held at the Lionel Wendt Theater Colombo from March 31 to April 3, 2016, ending with a festival dinner and a stand-up show. He also voiced for the radio teledrama Channa Kinnaravi on Hiru FM, and Paradige on RanOne FM. He currently runs an acting school named Hit Act in Bambalapitiya for the new generation.

Notable theater works

 Ada Kale Antigone
 Apahu Enna Ba
 Bakamuna Veedi Basi
 Balloth Ekka Ba
 Balloth Ekka Ba 2
 Bhoothawesha
 Charithe Horu Aran
Horu Samaga Heluwen 
 Janadipathi Thaththa
 Mata Erehiwa Mama
 Mata Wedi Thiyan Nedda?
 Rahas Udaviya
 Raja Man Wahala
 Rangahala
 Romba Thanks 
 Saadaya Marai Salli Hamarai
 Sihina Horu Aran
 Thunsiya Heta Eka (361)
 Veeraya Marila
 Wattala Giha and Maharagama Kumar

Notable television serials

 Adara Wassa
 Adaraneeya Amma 
 Adisi Nadiya 
 Ahanna Kenek Na 
 Aganthukaya
 Aluth Gedara
 Api Ape
 Aththamma
 Bath Amma
 Batti
 Black Town Story
 Bonda Meedum
 Dangayanta Pamanai
 Daskon
 Dhiriya Doni
 Doo Kumariyo
 Googly
 Hiru Kumari
 Hirusanda Maima 
 Ingammaruwa
 Isuru Pawura 
 Ithin Eeta Passe
 Katu Imbula 
 Kiripabalu Vila 
 Kokila Sandwaniya
 Makara Dadayama 
 Maunayagaya
 Maya Mansala
 Mindada
 Muthu Pihatu
 Nim Walalla 
 Nodath Desheka Arumawanthi
 Nonimi Yathra 
 No Parking
 Paara
 Pahasara
 Peramaga Salakunu 
 Pini Bindu 
 Raja Yogaya
 Rathi Virathi 
 Sadgunakaraya
 Sadisi Tharanaya 
 Samanalunta Wedithiyanna 
 Sandagalathenna 
 Sanda Thaniyama
 Satakapata
 Satya 
 Senehasa Kaviyak
 Senehase Nimnaya 
 Sillara Samanallu
 Sihina Genena Kumariye
 Sihina Samagama 
 Somibara Jaramara 
 Sooriya Daruwo
 Sudu Hansayo 
 Thanamalvila Kollek 
 Three-wheel Malli 
 Thunpath Ratawaka Lassana 
 Thurya
 Urumakkarayo
 Uthum Pathum
 Varanaya
 Veeduru Mal 
 Visula Ahasa Yata
 Wasantha Kusalana
 Wassana Sihinaya 
 Yakada Kahawanu

Filmography
Fernando started his film career with a minor role in 1996 film, Seeruwen Sitin directed by Winston Ajith Fernando.

Awards and accolades
He has won several awards at the local stage drama festivals and television festivals.

Youth Drama Festival Awards

|-
|| 1990 ||| Rangahala || Best Actor ||

State Drama Festival Awards

|-
|| 2001 ||| Mata Erehiwa Mama || Best Supporting Actor ||

Raigam Tele'es Awards

|-
|| 2016 ||| Daskon || Best Supporting Actor ||

References

External links
 Actor Gihan Fernando speaks that he give up about awards
 Lankan comedy based on British play
 Festival of three plays by Rajitha at Wendt in January
 රතු කට්ට පන්න ගන්නෙම නැහැ - Gihan Fernando
 ‘මම දකින මම’ තුළින් ඔබ දකින ඔබත් දකින්න - ප‍්‍රවීණ රංගන ශිල්පී ගිහාන් ප‍්‍රනාන්දු
 තරුවලට ගොඩක් කල් බබළන්න බෑ

Sri Lankan male film actors
Sinhalese male actors
Living people
1967 births